Michael Stevenson (born 2 October 1980) is an English actor, known for portraying the role of Iain Dean in BBC medical drama Casualty from 2012 until 2019 and from 2021.

Filmography

References

External links
 

Living people
English male soap opera actors
21st-century English male actors
1982 births